James Clifford (born 1945) is an interdisciplinary scholar whose work combines perspectives from history, literature, history of science, and anthropology.

Biography 
He grew up in New York City and was for thirty-three years Professor in the History of Consciousness Department at the University of California, Santa Cruz until his retirement in 2011. Clifford and Hayden White were the first faculty directly appointed to the graduate-only department at UC-Santa Cruz. Clifford served as department Chair from 2004–2007, and was the founding director of UCSC's Center for Cultural Studies. He has been a visiting professor in France, England and Germany and was elected to the American Academy of the Arts and Sciences in 2011.

James Clifford is the author of several widely cited and translated books, including The Predicament of Culture: Twentieth-Century Ethnography, Literature, and Art (1988), Routes: Travel and Translation in the Late 20th Century (1997), and Returns: Becoming Indigenous in the Twenty First Century (2013). He was co-editor (with George Marcus) of the widely influential collection Writing Culture: the Poetics and Politics of Ethnography (1986). Clifford's work has sparked controversy and critical debate in a number of disciplines, such as literature, art history and visual studies, and especially in cultural anthropology. His historical and rhetorical critiques of ethnography contributed to Anthropology's important self-critical, decolonizing period of the 1980s and early 1990s. Since then he has worked in a cultural studies framework that combines cross-cultural scholarship with the British Birmingham tradition. Since 2000 his writing has focused on processes of globalization and decolonization as they influence contemporary "indigenous" lives.

James Clifford's dissertation research was conducted at Harvard University in History (1970–1977), and focused on the history of anthropology. He specialized in the French tradition, writing on Marcel Mauss, Marcel Griaule, Michel Leiris, and Claude Lévi-Strauss. His dissertation and first book, "Person and Myth" (1982) was a study of the missionary-anthropologist Maurice Leenhardt and the colonial history of New Caledonia in French Melanesia.   A geographical interest in the Island Pacific continues to influence Clifford's scholarship on issues related to indigeneity, transnational flows, museum studies, visual and performance studies, cultural studies, and cross-cultural translation.

Published works 
Person and Myth: Maurice Leenhardt in the Melanesian World (University of California Press, 1982; Duke University Press, 1992)
Writing Culture: the Poetics and Politics of Ethnography, edited with George Marcus (University of California Press, 1986)
The Predicament of Culture: Twentieth-Century Ethnography, Literature, and Art (Harvard University Press, 1988)
Traveling Theories, Traveling Theorists, edited with Vivek Dhareshwar (Inscriptions 5, 1989)
Routes: Travel and Translation in the Late Twentieth Century (Harvard University Press, 1997)
On the Edges of Anthropology (Prickly Paradigm Press, 2003)
Returns: Becoming Indigenous in the Twenty First Century (Harvard University Press, 2013)

Further reading

References

External links 
James Clifford
"James Clifford: Tradition and Transformation at UC Santa Cruz" (Regional History Project, UCSC Library, 2013)

Living people
21st-century American historians
21st-century American male writers
Haverford College alumni
Harvard University alumni
Stanford University alumni
University of California, Santa Cruz faculty
Fellows of the American Academy of Arts and Sciences
1945 births
American male non-fiction writers